General Dadiani may refer to:

Andria Dadiani (1850–1910), Imperial Russian Army lieutenant general
David Dadiani (1813–1853), Imperial Russian Army major general
Didi-Niko Dadiani (1764–1834), Imperial Russian Army major general
Grigol Dadiani (Kolkhideli) (1814–1901), Imperial Russian Army general of the infantry
Konstantin Dadiani (1819–1889), Imperial Russian Army lieutenant general
Levan V Dadiani (1793–1846), Imperial Russian Army lieutenant general
Niko I Dadiani (1847–1903), Imperial Russian Army major general